Athenahealth (stylized as athenahealth) is a private American company that provides network-enabled services for healthcare and point-of-care mobile apps in the United States.

The company was founded in 1997 in San Diego and is now headquartered in Watertown, Massachusetts. They have also grown to include operational sites in Belfast, Maine, Atlanta, Georgia, Austin, Texas, Burlington, Vermont, Seattle, Washington, with international operations in Chennai, Bangalore, and Pune, India.

On February 15, 2022, the company was acquired by Bain Capital and Hellman & Friedman for $17 billion.

Company history

Athena Women's Health 
The company was founded by Jonathan Bush and Todd Park in 1997 as Athena Women's Health, a women's health and birthing center in San Diego, California.

At the birthing center, only 10% of babies were delivered by C-section, one third of the national average, and 90% of mothers were able to breastfeed their newborns, beating the national average of 67% at the time.

Athenahealth 
In 1998, venture funder Mark Wilson offered to buy Athenahealth's software for $11 million. Bush and Park turned down the offer and transitioned the business model from birthing centers to internet-based healthcare. They rebranded Athena Women's Health to Athenahealth, Inc., pulling in Ed Park, Todd Park's younger brother, an engineer, to develop a practice management system.

In 2000, Athenahealth's first client, Anchor Medical Associates, went live on athenaCollector, and, in February, its first electronic claim was submitted. While its first office opened its doors in Waltham, Massachusetts in 2002, Athenahealth moved to Watertown, Massachusetts in 2005 and is still headquartered there today.

Athenahealth announced an initial public offering of its common stock on June 22, 2007. The offering was completed on September 20, 2007, at a price of $18 per share. It traded on the NASDAQ exchange under the symbol ATHN until it was taken private in 2019.

Since moving its headquarters to Watertown in 2005, Athenahealth has created campuses in: Chennai, India, in 2005; Belfast, Maine, in 2008; Princeton, New Jersey, in 2013; Atlanta, Georgia, and San Francisco, California, in 2014; Austin, Texas, in 2015; and Bangalore and Pune, India, in 2017.

In January 2015, Athenahealth announced the acquisition of RazorInsights, a "leader in cloud-based EHR and financial solutions" for rural, critical access, and community hospitals. The purchase extended Athenahealth's established position in the outpatient market into the 50-bed and under inpatient care environment, which makes up nearly one third of the hospital market.

In February 2015, Athenahealth announced that it had purchased webOMR, a web-based clinical applications and EHR platform developed by Boston's Beth Israel Deaconess Medical Center. Athenahealth collaborated with BIDMC on the development of Athenahealth's acute care service offering, using Beth Israel Deaconess Hospital-Needham, a 58-bed community hospital, as the alpha development site.

On February 7, 2018, former CEO of General Electric, Jeffrey Immelt became the chairman of the board.  On June 6, 2018, Immelt was named executive chairman.

Athenahealth announced its acquisition of Praxify Technologies in June 2017.

From 2017 to 2018, under pressure from investor Elliott Management, Athenahealth undertook substantial cost-cutting measures, and Bush resigned.

In November 2018, Athenahealth was bought by Elliott and Veritas Capital for $5.7 billion, and then merged with an organisation that Veritas Capital had acquired from GE Healthcare in April 2018.

In late 2018, Athenahealth's private equity firm announced it was combining Virence Health into Athenahealth.  Virence was the former Clinical Business Solutions division of GE Healthcare which combined some assets from the former IDX Systems with its prior acquisitions of MedicaLogic and Millbrook.

On January 28, 2021, the United States Department of Justice reported that Athenahealth violated the False Claims Act (FCA) by paying illegal kickbacks to generate sales of its EHR product, athenaClinicals.

On February 15, 2022, the company was acquired by Bain Capital and Hellman & Friedman for $17 billion.

Illegal kickback allegations

On January 28, 2021, the United States Department of Justice reported that Athenahealth has agreed to pay $18.25 million to resolve allegations that it violated the False Claims Act (FCA) by paying illegal kickbacks to generate sales of its EHR product, athenaClinicals.

Products and services

athenaOne 
athenaOne is Athenahealth's fully integrated suite of cloud-based services, combining practice management (athenaCollector), an electronic health record (EHR) system (athenaClinicals), and care coordination (athenaCommunicator) into a single packaged offering.

athenaCollector 
Athenahealth's first product, athenaCollector, a cloud-based revenue cycle and practice management service, was launched in 2000. Built by Ed Park, the revenue cycle management system formed the foundation of athenaNet, Athenahealth's web-based system at large. (Ed Park would go on to become Athenahealth's Chief Operating Officer and member of its board.)

athenaClinicals 
In 2006, the company launched athenaClinicals, reported as the "first economically sustainable, service-based" electronic medical records (EMR) system. athenaClinicals has been ranked as leading the market in EHR usability, due to its productivity and ability to reduce providers’ work, effectiveness of delivering patient care, and intuitive user interface.

athenaCommunicator 
In 2008, Athenahealth introduced athenaCommunicator to manage phone calls. Since then, the product has evolved into a suite of "patient engagement services," including a patient portal, patient self-scheduling solution, and live operator service to better help patients to schedule appointments, reschedule appointments, and make payments.

Epocrates 
In 2013, the company purchased the Epocrates mobile brand, and continued to occupy Epocrates's offices in Princeton, New Jersey and San Francisco, California. Epocrates aggregates treatment information, including dosing and contraindications, to provide clinical decision support in the prescribing moments of care.

Epocrates drug monographs have also been embedded into the athenaClinicals EHR system to enhance productivity and reduce time not spent on patients.

Partnerships

More Disruption Please 
Athenahealth's More Disruption Please (MDP) program was launched in 2011. The initiative is both a partner program and an incubator environment for independent companies to develop products and services connected to Athenahealth's ecosystem.

In 2014, Athenahealth created the More Disruption Please accelerator, an opportunity for young startups still finding their legs to begin developing in Athenahealth's MDP space. “The goal of [the MDP accelerator] is to lower the barrier of entry for the best solutions to help us build the healthcare Internet,” said Mandira Singh, director of the More Disruption Please program. In its first full year, the accelerator added five companies to its portfolio.

In April 2016, Athenahealth acquired Arsenal Health, which developed a Smart Scheduling service for healthcare providers. Arsenal Health was Athenahealth's first MDP investment, in 2014.

Athenahealth launched MDP Labs in 2017. The program invites all entrepreneurs, from startups to mature companies, to innovate in healthcare and fix what's broken. Athenahealth's MDP Labs offered workspace in its downtown San Francisco office, tailored programming, dedicated mentorship, opportunities for partnerships and funding, and exposure to potential clients, though ended around 2019 with the closure of the San Francisco and other offices.

References

External links 
 

Companies based in Watertown, Massachusetts
Software companies based in Massachusetts
Health care companies based in Massachusetts
Electronic health record software companies
2007 initial public offerings
Companies formerly listed on the Nasdaq
2019 mergers and acquisitions
Health care companies established in 1997
Software companies established in 1997
American companies established in 1997
1997 establishments in California
Private equity portfolio companies
Software companies of the United States
2022 mergers and acquisitions
Bain Capital companies